Blue Butterfly is an album recorded by female Japanese pop artist Watanabe Misato. It was released on July 14, 2004 by Sony Music Entertainment.

Track listings

Midnight Parfait
Blue Butterfly
Morifa -Jasmine-
amagumo (=Rain Cloud)
Chou no you ni Hana no you ni (=Like a Butterfly, Like a Flower ) -You are the only one!-
Smile
Do Da Dance! -On Time de Hajimaru yo- (=-It starts on time!-)
Juu no Himitsu (=10 Secrets)
Heart of Gold
Kanashii Kuchizuke (=Sad Kiss)

External links
Sony Music Entertainment - Official site for Watanabe Misato.
Album Page - Direct link to page with song listings and music samples.

2004 albums
Misato Watanabe albums